James Gomez (born 14 November 2001) is a Gambian professional footballer who plays as a centre-back for Danish Superliga club AC Horsens, and the Gambia national team.

Club career
Having progressed through the academy of Real de Banjul, Gomez moved on loan to Danish club AC Horsens on 20 January 2020. On 4 August, the loan was extended for another six months. On 23 December 2020, he signed a permanent deal with the club on a contract until 2024.

International career
He made his debut for Gambia national football team on 8 June 2021 in a friendly against Togo and scored the only goal of the game.

Career statistics

Club

International

Scores and results list Gambia's goal tally first, score column indicates score after each Gomez goal.

References

2001 births
Living people
Gambian footballers
The Gambia under-20 international footballers
The Gambia international footballers
Gambian expatriate footballers
Association football forwards
Danish Superliga players
Danish 1st Division players
Real de Banjul FC players
AC Horsens players
2021 Africa Cup of Nations players
Gambian expatriate sportspeople in Denmark
Expatriate men's footballers in Denmark
People from Brikama